Blue Meanie(s) may refer to:

In fiction
 Blue Meanies (Yellow Submarine), fictional music-hating creatures in the films Yellow Submarine and Across the Universe
 Blue Meanies, fictional cat-like creatures in Katherine Applegate's book series Remnants

Other
 Blue Meanies (Illinois band), an American ska-core band founded in Carbondale, Illinois
 Blue Meanies (Canadian band), later known as New Meanies
 Blue Meanies (Apple Computer), a former engineering group within Apple Computer
 The Blue Meanie, real name Brian Heffron, a professional wrestler
 "Blue Meanie", a slang term for police officers
 "Blue Meanies From Outer Space", a game on the VIC20
 "Blue Meanie", a nickname for Holden Dealer Team special edition of the Holden VK Commodore